Jennifer Anne "Jenny" Kirk (born August 15, 1984) is an American former competitive figure skater. She is the 2000 World Junior champion and the 2002 Four Continents champion.

Early life 
Jennifer Kirk was born in Newton, Massachusetts. Prior to skating, she was a gymnast until the age of nine. She also studied ballet and once performed with the Boston Ballet.

Career 
Kirk grew interested in skating and began training with coaches Evy and Mary Scotvold at the age of 10 at the Skating Club of Boston. She was featured as a young up-and-coming skater on the PBS shows Zoom and Arthur. At 15, a piece of bone tore from her pelvis and jutted into her hip flexor.

Kirk won gold at the 2000 World Junior Championships. In 2002, she captured the Four Continents title. At the 2002 World Championships, she placed 15th in the short program before withdrawing due to a hip injury.

Ahead of the 2002–03 season, Kirk moved to train with Richard Callaghan in Detroit. In addition to single skating, she also briefly dabbled in pair skating with Fedor Andreev in the summer of 2003, describing it as fun but challenging. In the summer of 2004, Kirk moved to the Toyota Sports Center in El Segundo, California, to train with Frank Carroll and Ken Congemi.

Kirk won the bronze medal at the 2004 U.S. Championships. The following season, she withdrew from her first Grand Prix assignment due to an injury. She placed 10th at the 2004 Cup of Russia and won bronze at the 2005 Four Continents.

On September 7, 2005, Kirk announced her retirement from competitive figure skating. She moved to Boston, where she worked as a coach, but later returned to Southern California. Kirk's decision to quit competitive skating the year before the Olympics was profiled on Ice Diaries.

Kirk is a member of the U.S. Figure Skating International Committee. In the fall of 2012, she and her colleague, David Lease, launched "The Skating Lesson", a podcast and website. The two interview current and former skaters, coaches, choreographers and skating officials including Debi Thomas, Frank Carroll, Sandra Bezic, Alissa Czisny, Tiffany Chin, and Rudy Galindo. The web-series has garnered a following of thousands of figure skating fans with its weekly video interviews.

Personal life 
In May 1999, Kirk's mother, Pat Harris, was diagnosed with breast cancer. She died in August 2001. The loss of her mother was one of the reasons Kirk decided to retire. "Although I still love skating very much, my passion and love for the competitive aspect of the sport has dwindled following the death of my mother in 2001 and my nagging hip injuries."
In 2009, she revealed her career-long struggle with eating disorders and mentioned that it had been a factor in her decision to retire. She also stated that disordered eating was very common among skaters but not enough was being done to address the problem.

Programs

Results 
GP: Grand Prix; JGP: Junior Grand Prix

 At the 2002 World Championships, Kirk was 15th in the short program before withdrawing.

References

External links 

 
 

1984 births
Living people
American female single skaters
Sportspeople from Newton, Massachusetts
Four Continents Figure Skating Championships medalists
World Junior Figure Skating Championships medalists
21st-century American women